Clostridium colicanis is an anaerobic, motile, gram-positive bacterium.

References

Further reading

External links
 
 
 Type strain of Clostridium colicanis at BacDive -  the Bacterial Diversity Metadatabase

Gram-positive bacteria
Bacteria described in 2003
colicanis